Magnet Hill is a gravity hill located near Leh in Ladakh, India. The layout of the area and surrounding slopes create the optical illusion of a hill. The hill road is actually a downhill road. Objects and cars on the hill road may appear to roll uphill in defiance of gravity when they are, in fact, rolling downhill. It is 7.5 km southeast of Nimmoo and 26.5 km west of Leh on Srinagar-Ladakh road.

See also
 List of magnetic hills in India

References

Gravity hills
Geography of Ladakh
Tourism in Ladakh